The 2021 NFL season was the 102nd season of the National Football League (NFL). The season was the first to feature a 17-game regular season schedule as the league expanded the season from 16 games. The regular season started on September 9, 2021, with defending Super Bowl LV champion Tampa Bay defeating Dallas in the NFL Kickoff Game. The regular season ended on January 9, 2022. The playoffs started on January 15 and concluded with Super Bowl LVI, the league's championship game, at SoFi Stadium in Inglewood, California, on February 13, with the Los Angeles Rams defeating Cincinnati.

Player movement
The 2021 NFL league year and trading period began on March 17. On March 15, teams were allowed to exercise options for 2021 on players with option clauses in their contracts, submit qualifying offers to their pending restricted free agents, and submit a Minimum Salary Tender to retain exclusive negotiating rights to their players with expiring 2020 contracts and fewer than three accrued seasons of free agent credit. Teams were required to be under the salary cap using the "top 51" definition (in which the 51 highest paid-players on the team's payroll must have a combined salary cap). On March 17, clubs were allowed to contact and begin contract negotiations with players whose contracts had expired and thus became unrestricted free agents.

Free agency
Free agency began on March 17. Notable players to change teams included:

 Quarterbacks  Andy Dalton (Dallas to Chicago), Ryan Fitzpatrick (Miami to Washington), and Mitchell Trubisky (Chicago to Buffalo)
 Running backs Matt Breida (Miami to Buffalo), Tevin Coleman (San Francisco to New York Jets), James Conner (Pittsburgh to Arizona), Kenyan Drake (Arizona to Las Vegas), Wayne Gallman (New York Giants to San Francisco), Mark Ingram II (Baltimore to Houston), Phillip Lindsay (Denver to Houston), and Damien Williams (Kansas City to Chicago)
 Wide receivers Nelson Agholor (Las Vegas to New England), John Brown (Buffalo to Las Vegas), Corey Davis (Tennessee to New York Jets), Will Fuller (Houston to Miami), A. J. Green (Cincinnati to Arizona), Kenny Golladay (Detroit to New York Giants), Marvin Jones (Detroit to Jacksonville), Cordarrelle Patterson (Chicago to Atlanta), Curtis Samuel (Carolina to Washington), Emmanuel Sanders (New Orleans to Buffalo), and Sammy Watkins (Kansas City to Baltimore)
 Tight ends Jared Cook (New Orleans to Los Angeles Chargers), Hunter Henry (Los Angeles Chargers to New England), Kyle Rudolph (Minnesota to New York Giants), and Jonnu Smith (Tennessee to New England)
 Offensive linemen Pat Elflein (New York Jets to Carolina), Matt Feiler (Pittsburgh to Los Angeles Chargers), Eric Fisher (Kansas City to Indianapolis), Ted Karras (Miami to New England), Corey Linsley (Green Bay to Los Angeles Chargers), Alex Mack (Atlanta to San Francisco), Riley Reiff (Minnesota to Cincinnati), Joe Thuney (New England to Kansas City), Trai Turner (Los Angeles Chargers to Pittsburgh), Alejandro Villanueva (Pittsburgh to Baltimore), and Kevin Zeitler (New York Giants to Baltimore)
 Defensive linemen Jadeveon Clowney (Tennessee to Cleveland), Maliek Collins (Las Vegas to Houston), Trey Hendrickson (New Orleans to Cincinnati), Justin Houston (Indianapolis to Baltimore), Melvin Ingram (Los Angeles Chargers to Pittsburgh), Malik Jackson (Philadelphia to Cleveland), Carl Lawson (Cincinnati to New York Jets), Yannick Ngakoue (Baltimore to Las Vegas), Aldon Smith (Dallas to Seattle), Solomon Thomas (San Francisco to Las Vegas), Dalvin Tomlinson (New York Giants to Minnesota), Carlos Watkins (Houston to Dallas), and J. J. Watt (Houston to Arizona)
 Linebackers Jeremiah Attaochu (Denver to Chicago), Bud Dupree (Pittsburgh to Tennessee), Samson Ebukam (Los Angeles Rams to San Francisco), Kamu Grugier-Hill (Miami to Houston), Matthew Judon (Baltimore to New England), Christian Kirksey (Green Bay to Houston), Keanu Neal (Atlanta to Dallas), Kyle Van Noy (Miami to New England), Denzel Perryman (Los Angeles Chargers to Carolina), Haason Reddick (Arizona to Carolina) and Nick Vigil (Los Angeles Chargers to Minnesota)
 Defensive backs Chidobe Awuzie (Dallas to Cincinnati), A. J. Bouye (Denver to Carolina), Justin Coleman (Detroit to Miami), Ronald Darby (Washington to Denver), Kyle Fuller (Chicago to Denver), Shaquill Griffin (Seattle to Jacksonville), Troy Hill (Los Angeles Rams to Cleveland), Mike Hilton (Pittsburgh to Cincinnati), Malik Hooker (Indianapolis to Dallas), Adoree Jackson (Tennessee to New York Giants), William Jackson III (Cincinnati to Washington), Janoris Jenkins (New Orleans to Tennessee), Rayshawn Jenkins (Los Angeles Chargers to Jacksonville), John Johnson (Los Angeles Rams to Cleveland), Lamarcus Joyner (Las Vegas to New York Jets), Damontae Kazee (Atlanta to Dallas), Desmond King (Tennessee to Houston), Jalen Mills (Philadelphia to New England), and Patrick Peterson (Arizona to Minnesota)
Kicker Matt Prater (Detroit to Arizona)
Punters Matt Haack (Miami to Buffalo) and Cameron Johnston (Philadelphia to Houston)

Trades
The following notable trades were made during the 2021 league year:

 March 17: Detroit traded QB Matthew Stafford to the Los Angeles Rams in exchange for QB Jared Goff, a 2021 third round selection (No. 101), a 2022 first round selection, and a 2023 first round selection.
 March 17: Philadelphia traded QB Carson Wentz to Indianapolis in exchange for a 2021 third round selection and a conditional 2022 second round selection.
March 17: Las Vegas traded C Rodney Hudson and 2021 seventh round selection to Arizona in exchange for a 2021 third round selection.
March 17: New England traded OT Marcus Cannon and 2021 fifth and sixth round selections to Houston in exchange for 2021 fourth and sixth round selections.
March 17: Houston traded LB Benardrick McKinney and a 2021 seventh round selection to Miami in exchange for DE Shaq Lawson and a 2021 sixth round selection.
March 17: Las Vegas traded OT Trent Brown and a 2021 fifth round selection to New England in exchange for a 2021 seventh round selection.
April 5: The New York Jets traded QB Sam Darnold to Carolina in exchange for a 2021 sixth round selection and 2022 second and fourth round selections.
April 23: Baltimore traded OT Orlando Brown Jr., a 2021 second round selection, and a 2022 sixth round selection to Kansas City for 2021 first, third, and fourth round selections and a 2022 fifth round selection.
April 28: Carolina traded QB Teddy Bridgewater to Denver in exchange for a 2021 sixth round selection.
 May 18: Philadelphia traded CB Jameson Houston and a 2023 sixth round selection to Jacksonville in exchange for CB Josiah Scott.
 June 6: Atlanta traded WR Julio Jones and a 2023 sixth round selection to Tennessee in exchange for a 2022 second round selection and a 2023 fourth round selection.
 July 28: Houston traded WR Randall Cobb to Green Bay in exchange for a 2022 sixth round selection.
 August 12: Jacksonville traded LB Joe Schobert to Pittsburgh in exchange for a 2022 sixth round selection.
 August 17: Green Bay traded CB Josh Jackson to the New York Giants in exchange for CB Isaac Yiadom.
 August 30: Cincinnati traded C Billy Price to the New York Giants in exchange for DT B. J. Hill.
 August 31: Baltimore traded G Ben Bredeson and a 2022 fifth round selection to the New York Giants in exchange for a 2022 fourth round selection and a 2023 seventh round selection.
 August 31: The New York Jets traded TE Chris Herndon and a 2022 sixth round selection to Minnesota in exchange for a 2022 fourth round selection.
 September 8: Houston traded CB Bradley Roby to New Orleans in exchange for a 2022 third round selection and a conditional 2023 sixth round selection.
 September 27: Jacksonville traded CB C. J. Henderson and a 2022 fifth round selection to Carolina in exchange for TE Dan Arnold and a 2022 third selection.
 October 6: New England traded CB Stephon Gilmore to Carolina in exchange for a 2023 sixth round selection.
 October 15: Philadelphia traded TE Zach Ertz to Arizona in exchange for CB Tay Gowan and a 2022 fifth round selection.
 October 27: Houston traded RB Mark Ingram II to New Orleans in exchange for a 2024 seventh round selection.
 November 1: Denver traded LB Von Miller to the Los Angeles Rams in exchange for 2022 second and third round selections.
 November 2: Pittsburgh traded LB Melvin Ingram to Kansas City in exchange for a 2022 sixth round selection.
 November 2: Kansas City traded G Laurent Duvernay-Tardif to the New York Jets in exchange for TE Daniel Brown.

Retirements

Notable retirements

 QB Drew Brees – Thirteen-time Pro Bowler, five-time All-Pro (one first-team, four second-team), two-time Offensive Player of the Year (2008 and 2011), Super Bowl XLIV Champion and MVP, 2004 NFL Comeback Player of the Year, and 2006 Walter Payton Man of the Year. Played for the San Diego Chargers and New Orleans during his 20-year career.
 DE Jurrell Casey – Five-time Pro Bowler and one-time second-team All-Pro. Played for Tennessee and Denver during his 10-year career.
 WR Julian Edelman – Three-time Super Bowl Champion (XLIX, LI, and LIII) and Super Bowl LIII MVP. Played for New England during his entire 12-year career.
 LB Tamba Hali – Six-time Pro Bowler and two-time second-team All-Pro. Played for Kansas City during his entire 12-year career.
 G Mike Iupati – Four-time Pro Bowler and two-time All-Pro (one first-team, one second-team). Played for San Francisco, Arizona, and Seattle during his 11-year career.
 RB LeSean McCoy – Six-time Pro Bowler, two-time first-team All-Pro, and two-time Super Bowl Champion (LIV and LV). Played for Philadelphia, Buffalo, Kansas City and Tampa Bay during his 12-year career.
 C Maurkice Pouncey – Nine-time Pro Bowler and five-time All-Pro (three first-team, two second-team). Played for Pittsburgh during his entire 11-year career.
 C Mike Pouncey – Four-time Pro Bowler. Played for Miami and the Los Angeles Chargers during his 10-year career.
 QB Philip Rivers – Eight-time Pro Bowler and 2013 NFL Comeback Player of the Year. Played for the San Diego/Los Angeles Chargers and Indianapolis during his 17-year career.
 WR Demaryius Thomas – Five-time Pro Bowler, two-time second-team All-Pro, and Super Bowl 50 Champion. Played for Denver, Houston, New England, and the New York Jets during his 10-year career.
 K Adam Vinatieri – Three-time Pro Bowler, three-time first-team All-Pro, four-time Super Bowl Champion (XXXVI, XXXVIII, XXXIX, and XLI), and the NFL's all-time leading scorer. Played for New England and Indianapolis during his 24-year career.
 TE Jason Witten – Eleven-time Pro Bowler, four-time All-Pro (two first-team, two second-team), and 2012 Walter Payton Man of the Year. Played for Dallas and Las Vegas during his 17-year career.

Other retirements

Draft
The 2021 NFL Draft was held in Cleveland from April 29 to May 1.

Officiating changes
The NFL hired Maia Chaka as its second female official (joining Sarah Thomas) and first African-American female official.

NFL Senior Vice President of Officiating Alberto Riveron retired, leaving two other senior vice presidents, Walt Anderson and Perry Fewell, to co-head the NFL's officiating department. Without Riveron, multiple people in the officiating department will be making the final decisions over replay reviews instead of a single person.

Replay official Carl Madsen died on October 24. He was in his 12th season as a replay official, after an extended career as an on-field official.

The following officials were hired:

 Chad Adams (Replay Official)
 Maia Chaka (Line Judge)

Rule changes
The following rule changes were approved at the NFL Owner's Meeting on April 21:

 The jersey numbering system was modified as follows:
 Running backs, tight ends, and wide receivers can wear 1–49 and 80–89
 Defensive backs can wear 1–49
 Linebackers can wear 1–59 and 90–99
 The following remained unchanged: offensive linemen (50–79); defensive linemen (50–79, 90–99); and quarterbacks, punters, and kickers (1–19).
 Per the league's existing rules, any player who changed his number this season was required to buy out the inventory of his existing jersey before the change was made. A player who intends to change his number for the 2022 season can do so without cost.
 Overtime in preseason games was eliminated. This was the first season since  in which overtime was not used in the preseason.
 All accepted penalties by either team during consecutive extra point or two-point conversion attempts are to be enforced.
 The penalty for a second forward pass from behind the line of scrimmage and for a pass thrown after the ball returns behind the line will now include a loss of down.
 During kickoffs, the receiving team may have no more than nine players in the "set-up zone" (the area between 10 and 25 yards from the kickoff spot).
 An expansion of the booth-to-official communication on replays, allowing replay officials to advise on "specific, objective aspects of a play when clear and obvious video evidence is present and/or to address game administration issues."

COVID-19 protocols 
The league introduced COVID-19 protocols intended to encourage vaccination among players, coaches, and staff. On July 22, the NFL sent a memo warning teams that if a game that had been postponed due to COVID-19 outbreaks among unvaccinated players could not be rescheduled within the 18-week season schedule, the team responsible for the outbreak would be charged with a loss by forfeit, and be responsible for financial compensation to the other team, since teams typically do not get paid for cancelled games. On July 24, it was reported that the league will fine players $14,650 for each violation of COVID-19 protocol if they are unvaccinated.

On July 23, the league announced the following temporary rules for  would remain in place for 2021, allowing roster flexibility due to uncertainty regarding the pandemic.
A player on injured reserve could return after missing three games, instead of the normal eight. 
Teams could return an unlimited number of players from injured reserve throughout the year, instead of the normal limit of three.
Practice squads could include up to 16 players for each team, up from 12.
After 4:00 p.m. ET on the Tuesday of a game week, a team could designate up to four practice squad players as "protected," meaning they are not allowed to sign with another team until after their current team plays its next game.
Up to two practice squad players could be elevated to the active roster each game week without removing any current players, 4:00 p.m. ET the day before a game.

On August 30, the league and the National Football League Players Association (NFLPA) agreed to COVID testing protocols for the season. Fully vaccinated players were tested at least once per week and could opt for additional testing. Like in 2020, unvaccinated players were tested every day during the regular season and postseason except game days.

2021 deaths

Pro Football Hall of Fame members
Curley Culp Culp played 14 NFL seasons at defensive tackle for Kansas City, the Houston Oilers, and Detroit, winning Super Bowl IV with Kansas City. He was inducted into the Hall of Fame in 2013. He died on November 27, age 75.
Sam Huff Huff played 13 seasons in the NFL as a linebacker with the New York Giants and Washington, and was inducted into the Hall in 1982. He died November 13, age 87.
Claude Humphrey Humphrey played 14 seasons in the NFL as a defensive end with Atlanta and Philadelphia, and was inducted into the Hall in 2014. He died on December 3, age 77.
Floyd Little Little spent all nine seasons in the NFL as a running back with Denver and was inducted into the Hall in 2010. He died January 1, age 78.
John Madden Madden coached Oakland for 10 seasons, winning Super Bowl XI. He was inducted into the Hall in 2006. He died December 28, age 85.
Mick Tingelhoff Tingelhoff spent all 17 seasons in the NFL as a center with Minnesota and was inducted into the Hall in 2015. He died September 11, age 81.

Others

Preseason
Training camps were held from late July through August.

The Pro Football Hall of Fame Game was played on August 5, as Pittsburgh defeated Dallas. The two teams were previously scheduled to play the 2020 game before it was canceled due to the COVID-19 pandemic.

Corresponding with the expansion of the regular season to 17 games, the preseason was reduced to three games per team. NFC teams each hosted two preseason games and AFC teams each hosted one.  There was a league-wide bye week the weekend of September 4–5, between the final preseason game and the start of the regular season.

The August 28 game between Arizona and New Orleans was canceled due to Hurricane Ida. This was only the second time severe weather canceled a preseason game (a 2017 Dallas–Houston game was canceled due to Hurricane Harvey).

Regular season
The NFL released its regular season schedule on May 12. The season was played over an 18-week schedule beginning on September 9. Each of the league's 32 teams plays 17 games, with one bye week for each team. The regular season concluded on January 9, 2022; all games during the final weekend were intra-division games, as it has been since .

The 2020 collective bargaining agreement (CBA) signed by team owners and the NFLPA allowed for an expansion of the regular season from 16 to 17 games. On March 30, 2021, owners approved the expanded schedule. The extra game was added to the existing scheduling formula. Each team continues to play the other three teams in its own division twice, one game against each of the four teams from a division in its own conference, one game against each of the four teams from a division in the other conference, and one game against each of the remaining two teams in its conference that finished in the same position in their respective divisions the previous season (e.g., the team that finished fourth in its division would play all three other teams in its conference that also finished fourth in their divisions).

The added game is a fifth interconference matchup between divisions that had played each other two years earlier, based on the position in their respective divisions the previous season (e.g. the team that finished fourth in its division plays a club that finished fourth in a division of the other conference). AFC teams host the extra game in odd-numbered years, including 2021, with NFC teams getting the extra home game in even-numbered years.

The division pairings for 2021 are as follows:

Highlights of the 2021 season include:
NFL Kickoff Game: The 2021 season began with the Kickoff Game on Thursday, September 9 with Dallas at defending Super Bowl LV champion Tampa Bay .  Tampa Bay won the game.
NFL London Games: Two games were played at Tottenham Hotspur Stadium in London in 2021: New York Jets at Atlanta on October 10 and Miami at Jacksonville on October 17, with Atlanta and Jacksonville winning. The games started at 9:30 am EDT (2:30 pm BST). These games marked the return to international play after previous season's international games were canceled due to the COVID-19 pandemic and the resulting overseas travel restrictions.
Thanksgiving: As has been the case since , three games were scheduled for Thursday, November 25: Chicago at Detroit and Las Vegas at Dallas in the traditional daytime doubleheader, and Buffalo at New Orleans for the nightcap, with Chicago, Las Vegas, and Buffalo winning.
Christmas Day: Two games were scheduled for Christmas Day, which landed on a Saturday in 2021: Cleveland at Green Bay as a late-afternoon game, and Indianapolis at Arizona in primetime, with Green Bay and Indianapolis winning.

Scheduling changes
This section lists games that were moved or canceled because of severe weather, COVID-19 outbreaks, by way of flexible scheduling, or for other reasons, including games that were moved to Saturday.  When the entire season schedule was released on May 12, the league announced that in Weeks 15 and 18, two games would be moved to their respective Saturdays.

 Week 1:  Due to damage caused by Hurricane Ida in the New Orleans metropolitan area, the Green Bay–New Orleans game was moved to Jacksonville's TIAA Bank Field.
 Week 12: The Atlanta–Jacksonville game, originally scheduled at 1:00 p.m. ET on CBS, was cross-flexed to Fox, remaining at 1:00.
Week 13: 
The Denver–Kansas City game, originally scheduled at 1:00 p.m. ET on CBS, was flexed into NBC Sunday Night Football at 8:20 p.m. ET, replacing the originally scheduled San Francisco–Seattle game, which was flexed to 4:25 p.m. on CBS.
The Los Angeles Chargers–Cincinnati game, originally scheduled at 1:00 p.m. ET on Fox, was cross-flexed to CBS, remaining at 1:00.
The Jacksonville–Los Angeles Rams game, originally scheduled for 4:25 p.m. ET on CBS was flexed to 4:05 p.m. ET on Fox.
 Week 14:
The New Orleans–New York Jets game, originally scheduled at 1:00 p.m. ET on Fox, was cross-flexed to CBS, remaining at 1:00.
 The San Francisco–Cincinnati game, originally scheduled at 1:00 p.m. ET on CBS, was flexed to 4:25 p.m ET, still on CBS.
Week 15: 
On November 23, the NFL announced that two games would be moved to Saturday, December 18: Las Vegas–Cleveland at 4:30 p.m. ET and New England–Indianapolis at 8:15 p.m. ET, both exclusively on the NFL Network (though the Las Vegas-Cleveland game was later moved to Monday, December 20 due to a COVID-19 outbreak among Cleveland players). The three other games that the league had the option of scheduling on Saturday (Carolina–Buffalo, New York Jets–Miami, and Washington–Philadelphia), remained on Sunday, December 19 (though the Washington-Philadelphia game was delayed to Tuesday, December 21 due to a COVID-19 outbreak by Washington). 
 The Green Bay–Baltimore game, originally scheduled at 1:00 p.m. ET on Fox, was flexed to 4:25 p.m ET, still on Fox.
 The Las Vegas–Cleveland game, originally scheduled for Saturday at 4:30 p.m. ET, was moved to Monday at 5:00 PM ET, remaining on the NFL Network, due to an outbreak of COVID-19 among Cleveland.
 The Philadelphia–Washington game, originally scheduled for 1:00 p.m. ET on Fox, was moved to Tuesday at 7:00 p.m. ET, remaining on Fox, due to an outbreak of COVID-19 among Washington.
 The Los Angeles Rams–Seattle game, originally scheduled for 4:25 p.m. ET on Fox, was moved to Tuesday at 7:00 p.m. ET, remaining on Fox, due to an outbreak of COVID-19 among Los Angeles.
 Week 17:
 The Los Angeles Rams–Baltimore game, originally scheduled at 4:25 p.m. ET on Fox, was flexed to 1:00 p.m. ET, still on Fox.
 The Carolina–New Orleans game, originally scheduled at 1:00 p.m. ET on Fox, was flexed to 4:25 p.m ET, still on Fox.
 The Arizona-Dallas game, originally scheduled at 1:00 p.m. ET on Fox, was flexed to 4:25 p.m. ET, still on Fox.
 The Las Vegas-Indianapolis game, originally scheduled at 1:00 p.m. ET on CBS, was cross-flexed to Fox, remaining at 1:00.
 Week 18:
For the first time in league history, two games with playoff implications were moved to the last Saturday of the regular season. This move was announced at the same time as the final Sunday Night Football game on January 2, 2022. The Kansas City–Denver game, originally scheduled for Sunday at 4:25 p.m. ET on CBS, was moved to Saturday at 4:30 p.m. ET on ABC/ESPN, and the Dallas–Philadelphia game, originally scheduled for Sunday at 1:00 p.m. ET on Fox, was moved to Saturday at 8:15 p.m. ET, on ABC/ESPN. 
 The Los Angeles Chargers–Las Vegas game, originally scheduled for 4:25 p.m. ET on CBS, was flexed into NBC Sunday Night Football at 8:20 p.m. ET.
 The Cincinnati–Cleveland game, originally scheduled for 1:00 p.m. ET on CBS, was cross-flexed to Fox, remaining at 1:00.
 The New England–Miami game, originally scheduled for 1:00 p.m. ET on CBS, was flexed to 4:25 p.m. ET, still on CBS.
 The New York Jets–Buffalo game, originally scheduled for 1:00 p.m. ET on CBS, was flexed to 4:25 p.m. ET, still on CBS.
 The New Orleans–Atlanta game, originally scheduled for 1:00 p.m. ET on Fox, was flexed to 4:25 p.m. ET, still on Fox.
 The Carolina–Tampa Bay game, originally scheduled for 1:00 p.m. ET on Fox, was flexed to 4:25 p.m. ET. on CBS.

Regular season standings

Division

Conference

Postseason

The 2021 playoffs began with the wild-card round, with three Wild Card games played in each conference. Wild card weekend took place from January 15–17, 2022. This marks the first time that the wild card games were played over three consecutive days. Two games were played on Saturday, three on Sunday, and one on Monday night, marking the first Monday playoff game since .

In the divisional round, which was played on the weekend of January 22–23, the top seed in the conference played the lowest remaining seed and the other two remaining teams will play each other. The winners of those games advanced to the Conference Championships, which were played on January 30.

Super Bowl LVI was held on February 13 at 6:30 p.m. EST on NBC at SoFi Stadium in Inglewood, California.

Bracket

Records, milestones, and notable statistics

Week 1
 Tom Brady became the first player to start 300 career games at any position.
 Jameis Winston passed for 145 yards and five touchdowns, setting the record for fewest passing yards in a game with at least five passing touchdowns. The previous record of 158 yards was held by Eddie LeBaron.

Week 2 
 Julio Jones became the fastest player to reach 13,000 receiving yards, doing so in 137 games. The previous record of 154 games was held by Jerry Rice.
 Aaron Rodgers passed John Elway for tenth place on the all-time passing yards list.
 Travis Kelce became the fastest tight end to reach 8,000 receiving yards, doing so in 113 games. The previous record of 120 contests was held by Rob Gronkowski.

Week 3
 Justin Tucker set the NFL record for longest field goal with a 66-yard kick. The previous record of 64 yards was held by Matt Prater.
 Jamal Agnew tied the record for the longest play with a 109-yard return of a missed field goal for a touchdown.  The record is now shared with Antonio Cromartie and Cordarrelle Patterson.
 Tom Brady became the second player to record 80,000 passing yards, joining Drew Brees.
 Brady became the most-sacked quarterback in NFL history, breaking Brett Favre's record of 525 times sacked.
 Matt Ryan became the 10th player to record 350 passing touchdowns.
 Patrick Mahomes became the fastest player to reach 15,000 career passing yards, doing so in 49 games. The previous record of 53 games was held by Matthew Stafford.

Week 4 
 Ben Roethlisberger became the eighth player to record 400 passing touchdowns.
 Roethlisberger passed Dan Marino for sixth place on the all-time passing yards list.
 Russell Wilson became the 18th quarterback to win 100 career starts.
 Tom Brady became the NFL's all-time passing yards leader, breaking Drew Brees' record of 80,358 yards.
 Brady became the fourth quarterback to defeat all 32 teams, joining Brees, Brett Favre, and Peyton Manning.
 Patrick Mahomes set the records for most passing yards and passing touchdowns in a player's first 50 games with 15,348 and 125, respectively.  The previous record of 14,372 yards was held by Kurt Warner.  The previous record of 116 touchdowns was held by Marino.
 Andy Reid became the first head coach to win 100 games (regular season and playoffs combined) with two different franchises.
 The Baltimore Ravens had at least 100 rushing yards for the 43rd straight game, tying the 1974–77 Pittsburgh Steelers for the most consecutive such games.

Week 5
Antonio Brown became the fastest player to reach 900 career receptions, doing so in 143 games. The previous record of 149 games was held by Marvin Harrison.
Aaron Rodgers passed Dan Marino and Philip Rivers for fifth place on the all-time touchdown passes list.
Matt Ryan passed Eli Manning for eight place on the all-time passing yards list.
Ryan became the seventh player to reach 5,000 career completions.
 The Cleveland Browns became the first team in NFL history to lose a game despite scoring 40 or more points and not turning the ball over. Teams with 40+ points and no turnovers had previously been 442–0.
 League-wide, kickers missed 13 point after touchdown attempts, breaking the record for a single week. The previous record of 12 misses was set in week 11 of the  season.

Week 6
Lamar Jackson set the record for most wins by a starting quarterback before his 25th birthday with his 35th win.  The previous record of 34 wins was held by Dan Marino.

Week 7
Tom Brady became the first player to record 600 career passing touchdowns.
Matthew Stafford became the 13th player to record 300 career passing touchdowns.

Week 8
Tom Brady became the second player to complete 7,000 career passes, joining Drew Brees.
Brady set the record for most games with at least three touchdown passes and most games with at least four touchdown passes with 98 and 38, respectively.  Both records were previously held by Brees.
Mike White set the record for most completions in a first career start with 37.

Week 10
Bill Belichick became the fourth head coach to win at least 250 games with one team, joining George Halas, Don Shula, and Tom Landry.
The Tennessee Titans became the second team to win five consecutive games over teams who made the playoffs the previous season, joining the 2003 Philadelphia Eagles.

Week 11
Jonathan Taylor tied the record for most consecutive games with at least 100 rushing yards and a rushing touchdown with eight.  He shares the record with Lydell Mitchell and LaDainian Tomlinson.
Christian McCaffrey became the fastest player to record 3,000 rushing yards and 3,000 receiving yards, doing so in 57 games.  The previous record of 66 games was held by Alvin Kamara.
Tom Brady became the first player to attempt 11,000 career passes.

Week 12
Aaron Rodgers passed Philip Rivers for eighth on the all-time wins list for a starting quarterback, with 135.
Keenan Allen tied the record for fastest player to reach 700 career receptions, doing so in 111 games.  He shares the record with Antonio Brown.
Tom Brady passed Ben Roethlisberger for the third most career game-winning drives with 51.
Ben Roethlisberger passed Philip Rivers for fifth on the career pass completions list.

Week 13
 Tom Brady and Rob Gronkowski passed Philip Rivers and Antonio Gates for second place on the list of most touchdowns by a passer-receiver duo, with 90.
  Adrian Peterson tied Jim Brown for tenth place on the most total touchdowns list, with 126.
 The Miami Dolphins became the second team in NFL history to win five straight games immediately following a losing streak of seven or more games, joining the 1994 New York Giants.

Week 14
 Tom Brady became the all-time pass completions leader, breaking Drew Brees' record of 7,142 completions.
 Brady became the first player to throw 700 passing touchdowns (regular season and playoffs combined).
 Brady with his 13th career 4,000 yard season, moved to second place in the most 4,000 yard seasons.
 Aaron Rodgers became the fifth player to throw at least 60 touchdown passes against a single opponent, doing so against the Chicago Bears.
Justin Herbert became the first player to record 30 touchdown passes in each of his first two seasons.
Herbert set the record for most pass completions by a player in his first two seasons.  The previous record of 724 was held by Kyler Murray.
Josh Allen became the fourth player to pass for 300 yards and run for 100 yards in the same game, joining Lamar Jackson, Cam Newton, and Russell Wilson.

Week 15
 Ben Roethlisberger passed Philip Rivers for fifth place on the all-time passing yards list.
Tom Brady became the first player to be selected to 15 Pro Bowls.  He previously shared the record of 14 with four other players.

Week 16
 Justin Jefferson set the record for most receiving yards in a player's first two seasons, ultimately with 3,016. The previous record of 2,755 yards was held by Odell Beckham Jr.
 Joe Burrow passed for 525 yards, the fourth most passing yards by a player in a single game in NFL history.  
 Josh Allen became the first player to record 100 passing touchdowns and 20 rushing touchdowns in his first four seasons.
 Dak Prescott became the first player to throw a touchdown pass to a running back, wide receiver, tight end, and offensive lineman in the same game.
 The Jacksonville-New York Jets game featured two touchdowns scored by offensive linemen.  This marked the first time multiple touchdowns were scored by offensive linemen in the same game in NFL history.
 The Miami Dolphins became the first team in NFL history to win seven straight games immediately following a seven-game losing streak.

Week 17
 Ja'Marr Chase set the record for most receiving yards by a rookie in a single game, with 266.  The previous record of 255 yards was held by Jerry Butler.
 Chase also set the record for receiving yards by a rookie in a season.  The previous record of 1,400 yards was held by Justin Jefferson.
 Tom Brady became the second player to throw 40 touchdown passes in consecutive seasons, joining Drew Brees.
 Josh Allen became the first player to record 100 passing touchdowns and 30 rushing touchdowns in his first four seasons.
 Bill Belichick tied the record for most 10-win seasons by a head coach, with 20.  He shares the record with Don Shula.
 Matt LaFleur won his 39th game as a head coach, setting a record for most wins by a head coach in his first three seasons.  The previous record of 38 was held by George Seifert.

Week 18
 Travis Kelce became the fastest tight end in NFL history to reach 9,000 receiving yards, doing so in 127 games.
 Tom Brady broke the single season record for pass completions, with 485. The previous record of 471 was held by Drew Brees.
 Brady became the oldest player  to lead the league in passing yards and passing touchdowns, at 44 years of age.  Brady previously set both records at age 40.
 Brady also became the oldest player to pass for 5,000 yards in a single season, and joined Brees as the only quarterbacks in NFL history with multiple 5,000 yard seasons.
T. J. Watt tied the record for most sacks in a season, with 22.5. He shares the record with Michael Strahan.
Cooper Kupp became the fourth player in NFL history to lead the league in receptions, receiving yards, and receiving touchdowns in the same season, joining Jerry Rice, Sterling Sharpe, and Steve Smith Sr.
Jaylen Waddle set the record for most receptions by a rookie, with 104.  The previous record of 101 was held by Anquan Boldin.
Mike Evans became the first player in NFL history to have 1,000 receiving yards in each of his first eight seasons.
Justin Herbert set the record for most touchdown passes in a player's first two seasons, with 69.  The previous record of 68 was held by Dan Marino.
Rob Gronkowski set the record for most games with 100 receiving yards by a tight end, with 32.  The previous record of 31 was held by Tony Gonzalez.
The Las Vegas Raiders set the record for most wins on the final play of a game, with six.

Wild Card Round
The Buffalo Bills became the first team in NFL history to complete a game without any punts, turnovers, or field goal attempts.

Divisional Round
Ja’Marr Chase became the first rookie to have multiple 100-yard receiving games in the postseason.
Gabe Davis set the record for most receiving touchdowns in a playoff game, with four.  The previous record of three was shared by 16 players.
Josh Allen and Patrick Mahomes became the first opposing quarterbacks to each pass for at least 300 yards, three touchdowns, and no interceptions, and rush for at least 50 yards in the same game.

Conference Championships:
Evan McPherson tied the record for most playoff games with at least four field goals, with three. He shares the record with Adam Vinatieri.
McPherson set the record for most field goals by a rookie in the playoffs, ultimately with 14. The previous record of 8 was held by Stephen Gostkowski.

Super Bowl LVI
Evan McPherson tied the record for most field goals in a single postseason, with 14. He shares the record with Adam Vinatieri.
Von Miller tied the record for most career sacks in the Super Bowl, with 4.5.  He shares the record with Charles Haley.
Sean McVay became the youngest head coach to ever win a Super Bowl, at 36 years, 20 days of age.  The previous record of 36 years, 323 days was held by Mike Tomlin.
The Los Angeles Rams tied the record for most sacks in a Super Bowl, with seven.  They share the record with the 1975 Pittsburgh Steelers, 1985 Chicago Bears, and 2015 Denver Broncos.

Regular-season statistical leaders

Awards

Individual season awards

The 11th Annual NFL Honors, saluting the best players and plays from 2021 season, was held on February 10, 2022, at the YouTube Theater in Inglewood, California.

All-Pro team

The following players were named First Team All-Pro by the Associated Press:

Players of the week/month
The following were named the top performers during the 2021 season:

Head coaching and front office changes

Head coaches

Off-season

In-season

Front office personnel

Off-season

Stadiums

Stadium changes 
 Kansas City sold naming rights to its home stadium to health insurer GEHA, renaming the facility to GEHA Field at Arrowhead Stadium. It is the first time in the stadium's 50-year history that it has had a naming rights sponsor.
 Buffalo sold naming rights to its home stadium to Pittsburgh-based health insurer Highmark, resulting in the stadium being renamed Highmark Stadium.
New Orleans sold naming rights to its home stadium to casino operator Caesars Entertainment, renaming the facility to the Caesars Superdome.
Carolina changed the playing surface at Bank of America Stadium from natural grass to an artificial FieldTurf surface.

COVID-19 restrictions 
Aided by the availability of vaccines, by June 29 all 32 NFL teams had received approval to play their games with no restrictions on attendance. However, after a recent increase in cases due to the Delta variant, several teams implemented fan restrictions, mainly due to local or state-level public health restrictions for events being re-enacted in response to the increase, however this purely involves requirements for masking, testing, vaccination or any combination thereof and not on attendance.

In addition, mascots, cheerleaders, and sideline reporters that were not allowed to be on the field in 2020 were allowed to return to the field for 2021.

Uniforms

Uniform changes
 Cincinnati unveiled new uniforms on April 19. The uniforms are similar to their previous set, but have removed some features such as colored shoulder pads, TV numbers, side panels and outlined nameplates for a toned-down appearance.  The team's trademark stripes were left as the most prominent feature.
 Cleveland will feature a new white uniform reminiscent of their uniform's 1946 design, commemorating the team's 75th anniversary. Helmet sides are divided with a thin white stripe and have corresponding numbering on either side. Jersey numbers are brown with an orange drop shadow.
 Detroit unveiled new white pants on September 20.
 Green Bay revealed a new throwback on August 19. This throwback design is based on their 1950s all-green look, featuring green jerseys and pants, golden stripes, numbers and nameplates, and blank golden helmets with gray facemasks. Prior to the 2020 season, which featured no alternate uniforms for the team, the team used blue jersey based throwbacks as their third uniform from 2010 to 2019.
 Indianapolis will wear a new throwback uniform on November 28. The design pays homage to the 1956 team, featuring a three-stripe shoulder pattern and helmets with rear logo placement. This design is similar to the one found on the helmet worn with their 2010 alternate uniforms.
 Jacksonville made its alternate teal jerseys its primary uniform. The team had previously used teal jerseys as the primary uniform from 1995 to 2011.
 The Los Angeles Rams revealed a modern throwback variation of their away uniforms on July 13. This design incorporates blue and yellow sleeves, similar to the ones worn on team uniforms from 1978 to 1999.
The New York Giants will wear new white pants, featuring a stripe pattern resembling their sleeve stripe pattern, with their road uniforms replacing the gray pants. However, the gray pants will be retained for their Week 6 matchup against the Los Angeles Rams to commemorate the 10th anniversary of their Super Bowl XLVI win.
 San Francisco unveiled new red throwback uniforms based on the 1994 Super Bowl team on June 30 in celebration of the franchise's 75th anniversary. The uniforms, which feature white numbers with black drop shadows, are counterpart to the all-white 1994 throwback uniforms used by the team since 2018.

Patches
 Cleveland and San Francisco unveiled logos to commemorate the 75th anniversary (from the founding of their first league, the All-America Football Conference) for each franchise.

20th anniversary of September 11th attacks
The first week of the season coincided with the 20th anniversary of the September 11 attacks. To commemorate that event, all players wore a stars and stripes ribbon decal bearing the dates "9/11/01" and "9/11/21" on their helmets. Players were also allowed to wear special red, white, and blue gloves and shoes. Furthermore, coaches and league, team, and broadcast personnel were provided ribbon-shaped pins with the same design as the aforementioned decals. In addition, specially designed hats designed by New Era Cap Company bearing New York City Fire Department, New York City Police Department, or Port Authority of New York and New Jersey Police Department insignia were worn by players during the Denver–New York Giants and New York Jets–Carolina games.

Media

Broadcast rights

Television
This was the eighth year under the current nine-year broadcast contracts with CBS, Fox, and NBC; and the eighth and final year under the current contract with ESPN/ABC. This included "cross-flexing" (switching) Sunday afternoon games between CBS and Fox before or during the season, regardless of the conference of the visiting team. NBC aired Sunday Night Football, the Kickoff Game, and one Thanksgiving game. ESPN's rights to Monday Night Football were modified this season, allowing ABC to simulcast select games (Weeks 1, 14, and 15), as well as a new Saturday doubleheader in Week 18. Thursday Night Football aired on NFL Network, with Fox and Amazon Prime Video simulcasting 11 games.

This was the second year that CBS and NBC aired two Wild Card games.

NBC televised Super Bowl LVI along with Telemundo Deportes which aired its first super bowl in Spanish on Broadcast Television. CBS was originally scheduled to broadcast the game under the current rotation. However, CBS traded the game to NBC in exchange for Super Bowl LV to avoid counterprogramming (as per an untold gentlemen’s agreement between the networks)  by the 2022 Winter Olympics, as this was the first Super Bowl to be scheduled during an ongoing Olympic Games. NBC also holds the U.S. broadcast rights to the Olympics. Due to NBC's coverage of the 2020 Summer Olympics (held 2021), the network sold its broadcast rights to the Pro Football Hall of Fame Game to Fox.

On March 18, the NFL announced its future television deals for 2023–2033, which will see CBS, Fox, and NBC maintain their existing Sunday packages with expanded digital rights for their streaming services (Paramount+, Tubi, and Peacock, respectively). Thursday Night Football will move exclusively to Amazon. ESPN also entered into a new agreement for Monday Night Football for 2022, adding the aforementioned Week 18 Saturday doubleheader beginning this season.

It was later announced in May that Fox and NFL Network had opted out of its final season of Thursday Night Football, so Amazon will take over TNF starting 2022. NBC maintained Spanish-language rights to Sunday Night Football for Universo, while its Spanish broadcast network Telemundo would air selected games, including NBC's Wild Card games and Super Bowl LVI.

On July 19, ESPN announced an agreement with Omaha Productions, the production company of Peyton Manning, to produce Monday Night Football with Peyton and Eli, a supplemental telecast of Monday Night Football on ESPN2 and ESPN+ with Manning, his brother Eli, and guest celebrities for ten games each season from 2021 to 2023.

For the second consecutive season, Nickelodeon simulcast a wild-card playoff game with CBS using the same youth-friendly broadcast modifications that were in place the previous season. The CBS feed of the game was also streamed on Amazon Prime Video.

On October 13, the league announced that ESPN and ABC signed a five-year deal to simulcast the Monday Night wild-card playoff game, with ESPN2 and ESPN+ providing the "Peyton and Eli" broadcast.

Most watched regular season games
DH = doubleheader; SNF = Sunday Night Football; MNF = Monday Night Football; TNF = Thursday Night Football

*Note – Late DH matchups listed in table are the matchups that were shown to the largest percentage of the market.

References

NFL
National Football League seasons